NRT may refer to:

Businesses and organizations
 NRT (company), formerly National Realty Trust, an American real-estate brokerage
 National Response Team (www.NRT.org)
 New Road Team, Nepalese sports club
 NRT News, Iraqi broadcaster

Medicine 
 Neuroreflexotherapy, alternative treatment for back pain
 Nicotine replacement therapy, to stop smoking
 Thalamic reticular nucleus in vertebrates' brains

Places
 Narita International Airport, Chiba prefecture, Japan (by IATA code)
 Nethertown railway station,  Cumbria, England (by station code)

Science and technology 
 Near real-time in telecommunications
 Net register tonnage, the volume of cargo a ship can carry
 Non-Real-Time Content Delivery of digital TV

Other uses 
 National Recreation Trail, US designation
 Norm-referenced test, test scored relative to the performance of other participants